Tory's Falls, also called Tory Falls and Torys Falls is a waterfall in North Central North Carolina, located in Hanging Rock State Park in Stokes County.

History
The falls are located near an area called "Tory's Den", a cave that was purportedly used by Tories during the American Revolution.

Visiting the Falls
The falls are open to the public and are accessible beginning at a parking area on the side of Charlie Young Road.  Visitors may take a moderate-difficulty 300 yard (275m) trail to the falls.  It is difficult to see the entire falls from any one location, and the water source occasionally dries up to a trickle.

Nearby Falls
Hanging Rock State Park hosts 4 other waterfalls:

Lower Cascades
Upper Cascades
Window Falls
Hidden Falls

External links
 North Carolina Waterfalls - Tory's Falls and Hanging Rock

References

Protected areas of Stokes County, North Carolina
Waterfalls of North Carolina
Waterfalls of Stokes County, North Carolina